The G.W.C. Whiting School of Engineering is the engineering college of the Johns Hopkins University, a private research university in Baltimore, Maryland.

History

Engineering at Johns Hopkins was originally created in 1913 as an educational program that included exposure to liberal arts and scientific inquiry. In 1919, the engineering department became a separate school, known as the School of Engineering. By 1937, over 1,000 students had graduated with engineering degrees. By 1946 the school had six departments.

In 1961, the School of Engineering changed its name to the School of Engineering Sciences and, in 1966, merged with the Faculty of Philosophy to become part of the School of Arts and Sciences.  In 1979, the engineering programs were organized into a separate academic division that was named the G.W.C. Whiting School of Engineering. The school's named benefactor is George William Carlyle Whiting, co-founder of The Whiting-Turner Contracting Company.

Several departments at the school have been nationally and historically recognized. The Johns Hopkins Department of Biomedical Engineering is recognized as the top-ranked program in the nation. The Department of Geography and Environmental Engineering has consistently ranked as one of the top 5 programs nationally by U.S. News & World Report in recent years.

The Department of Mechanical Engineering is well known for its fundamental and historic contributions, especially in the fields of mechanics and fluid dynamics. Although it has always been a very small department, an uncharacteristically large number of highly acclaimed scholars have been associated with it over the years. These include Clifford Truesdell, Owen Martin Philips, Jerald Ericksen, James Bell, Stanley Corrsin, Robert Kraichnan, John L. Lumley, Leslie Kovasznay, Walter Noll, K. R. Sreenivasan, Hugh Dryden, Shiyi Chen, Andrea Prosperetti, Fazle Hussain, Harry Swinney, Stephen H. Davis, Gregory L. Eyink, Charles Meneveau, Joseph Katz (professor),  Lauren Marie Gardner, Gretar Tryggvason and Mohamed Gad-el-Hak. Many of the landmark papers in the field of fluid mechanics (turbulence in particular) were written using data from the Corrsin Wind Tunnel Laboratory. The wind tunnel is still in operation today. The department was also home to the school of rational mechanics. It was recently ranked as one of the top 5 departments in the nation for research activity by the National Research Council (the department was ranked 13th by the generic U.S. News & World Report rankings), and is still considered one of the main centers of fundamental research in fluid dynamics and solid mechanics.

Departments
The Whiting School contains nine departments:
 Applied Mathematics & Statistics 
 Biomedical Engineering
 Chemical and Biomolecular Engineering 
 Computer Science 
 Electrical and Computer Engineering 
  Civil and Systems Engineering
 Environmental Health and Engineering (formerly Geography and Environmental Engineering) 
 Materials Science & Engineering 
 Mechanical Engineering

Engineering Programs for Professionals 
The Engineering for Professionals (EP) program is a part-time program offering on-site and online options at the Whiting School. EP offers master's degree programs and courses in 21 distinct disciplines.

The Johns Hopkins University first offered courses to working engineers in 1916, held “Night Courses for Technical Workers” in response to the potential for United States involvement in World War I. The part-time undergraduate engineering program realized its largest enrollments for a time after World War II when returning servicemen and women received GI Bill benefits for a college education.

Until the late 1950s, part-time courses were primarily offered at the undergraduate level on the Johns Hopkins Homewood campus. In 1958, the Johns Hopkins Applied Physics Laboratory (APL) began to offer advanced technical courses at the graduate level with credit toward Johns Hopkins academic degrees under the auspices of that institution’s Evening College.

By 1963, APL established a formal center for the Evening College to meet growing demand. Over the years, the number and variety of engineering and applied science courses and master’s degree program expanded, so that by 1983 five master's degrees were offered at the APL Education Center: Applied Physics, Computer Science, Electrical Engineering, Numerical Science, and Technical Management.

In 1983, the APL-based programs came under the oversight of the re-established engineering school at Johns Hopkins, the G.W.C. Whiting School of Engineering. At that time, eight additional degree programs were added: undergraduate programs in Civil, Electrical, and Mechanical Engineering and five master's degree programs in Chemical Engineering, Civil Engineering, Environmental Engineering, Materials Engineering and Mechanical Engineering.

Johns Hopkins professionals engineering education has changed its name several times to reflect added programs, advancing technology, and a changing workforce. Its name was the Part-Time Engineering Program from 1983 to 1987, Continuing Professional Programs from 1987 to 1992, Part-Time Programs in Engineering and Applied Science from 1992 to 2004, Engineering and Applied Science Programs for Professionals from 2004 to 2008, and Engineering for Professionals from 2008 to the present. Also, several degree programs have changed their names to reflect changes in focus, and in several cases, concentrations in existing programs have become new programs in their own right.

EP is accredited by the Middle States Association of Colleges and Schools.

Academic centers and institutes
Center for Educational Outreach
Center for Leadership Education 
Johns Hopkins University Information Security Institute is the newest addition to the graduate programs affiliated with Johns Hopkins. The Institute is the "university's focal point for research and education in information security, assurance and privacy." JHUISI is the only Institute in the Whiting School with an academic degree program, offering the Master of Science in Security Informatics (MSSI).

Research centers and institutes

Advanced Technology Laboratory
Applied Physics Laboratory
Center for Advanced Metallic and Ceramic Systems
Center for Systems Science and Engineering
Malone Center for Engineering in Healthcare
Center for Cardiovascular Bioinformatics and Modeling
Center for Contaminant Transport, Fate, and Remediation
Center for Environmental and Applied Fluid Mechanics
Center for Hazardous Substances in Urban Environments
Center for Imaging Science
Center for Language and Speech Processing
Center for Materials Sensing and Detection
Center for Multi-Functional Appliqué
Center for Networking and Distributed Systems
Chemical Propulsion Information Analysis Center
Engineering Research Center for Computer-Integrated Surgical Systems and Technology
Institute for Computational Medicine
Institute for Data Intensive Engineering and Science
Institute in Multiscale Modeling of Biological Interactions
Institute for NanoBioTechnology
Johns Hopkins Systems Institute
Johns Hopkins University Information Security Institute
Materials Research Science and Engineering Center
Whitaker Biomedical Engineering

References

External links
Official website

Engineering
Engineering schools and colleges in the United States
Engineering universities and colleges in Maryland
Educational institutions established in 1913
1913 establishments in Maryland